El Dorado Union High School District is a public 9-12th grade school district located in the southern half of El Dorado County, California.

Schools
There are four comprehensive high schools in the district
 El Dorado High School, Placerville (est. 1928)
 Oak Ridge High School, El Dorado Hills (est. 1980)
 Ponderosa High School, Shingle Springs (est. 1963)
 Union Mine High School, El Dorado (est. 1999)

Planning

The district has a considerable track record of advanced planning.  In the late 1980s the district embarked on an analysis of long term forecasting including district population forecasts, employer surveys, economic development within the district and household formations.  The El Dorado Union High School District produced initial forecasts that led to a set of facilities plans and developer fee structures to sustain the development and expansion of district facilities. (Earth Metrics Inc, 1989)

Bibliography
Relation of commercial and industrial growth to the need for additional school facilities in the El Dorado Union High School District , Earth Metrics Inc., Sept. 1989

External links
El Dorado Union High School District site
El Dorado County Office of Education site

References

School districts in El Dorado County, California
1928 establishments in California
School districts established in 1928